The 2018 Norwegian Football Cup was the 113th edition of the Norwegian annual knock-out football tournament. It began with qualification matches in March and April 2018. The first round was played from 17–19 April 2018 and the tournament concluded with the final on 2 December 2018.

Rosenborg won their twelfth Cup title. The victory would have earned them a place in the first qualifying round of the 2019–20 UEFA Europa League, but since the club already had qualified to the 2019–20 UEFA Champions League as winners of the 2018 Eliteserien, this berth was passed down to Haugesund, fourth-place finishers in the league.

Calendar
Below are the dates for each round as given by the official schedule:

Source:

First round

Second round

Third round

Fourth round

Quarter-finals

Semi-finals

Final

Scorers
8 goals:

 Mustafa Abdellaoue - Strømsgodset

7 goals:

 Tobias Lauritsen - Odd

4 goals:

 Deyver Vega - Brann
 Gabriel Andersen - Harstad
 Benjamin Stokke - Kristiansund
 Thomas Lehne Olsen - Lillestrøm 
 Alexander Søderlund - Rosenborg
 Bård Finne - Vålerenga

3 goals:

 Joakim Hammersland - Åsane
 Jone Rugland - Fram Larvik
 Frederik Gytkjær - Haugesund
 Adem Güven - Kongsvinger
 Gary Martin - Lillestrøm
 Ifeanyi Mathew - Lillestrøm
 Quint Jansen - Mjøndalen
 Daniel Chima Chukwu - Molde
 Eirik Søfting Høgseth - Mosjøen
 Michael Karlsen - Ranheim
 Nicklas Bendtner - Rosenborg
 Erik Botheim - Rosenborg
 Tobias Heintz - Sarpsborg 08
 Ronnie Schwartz - Sarpsborg 08
 Alexander Ruud Tveter - Sarpsborg 08
 Franck Boli - Stabæk
 Aron Sigurðarson - Start
 Sondre Stokke - Stjørdals-Blink
 Eirik Ulland Andersen - Strømsgodset

2 goals:

 Juan Manuel Cordero - Alta
 Rasmus Christensen - Arendal
 Alagie Sanyang - Asker
 Behajdin Celina - Asker
 Erblin Llullaku - Bærum
 Patrick Berg - Bodø/Glimt
 Martin Bjørnbak - Bodø/Glimt
 Jens Petter Hauge - Bodø/Glimt
 Geir André Herrem - Bodø/Glimt
 Kristian Fardal Opseth - Bodø/Glimt
 Henrik Kjelsrud Johansen - Brann
 Willy Zamble - Brattvåg
 Christer Husa - Florø
 Youssef Chaib - Fredrikstad
 Johnny Per Buduson - HamKam
 Ole Erik Midtskogen - HamKam
 Viktor Martin Framvik - Harstad
 Kristoffer Velde - Haugesund
 Moses Mawa - KFUM Oslo
 Shuaibu Ibrahim - Kongsvinger
 Niklas Castro - Kongsvinger
 Liridon Kalludra - Kristiansund
 Vegard Voll - Levanger
 Erik Næsbak Brenden - Lillestrøm
 Aleksander Torvanger - Mjølner
 Jibril Bojang - Mjøndalen
 Andreas Hellum - Mjøndalen
 Mikkel Aleksander Aarstrand - Moss
 Tim Andre Reinback - Moss
 Ibrahima Wadji - Molde
 Akinbola Akinyemi - Notodden
 Filipe Ferreira - Notodden
 Elbasan Rashani - Odd
 Stefan Mladenovic - Odd
 Erik Helgetun - Orkla
 Jens Erik Johansen - Ørn-Horten
 Solomon Owusu - Raufoss
 Matias Belli Moldskred - Raufoss
 Anton Henningsson - Raufoss
 Anders Konradsen - Rosenborg
 Flamur Kastrati - Sandefjord
 Axel Kryger - Sandnes Ulf
 Mesüt Can - Skeid
 Ulrik Flo - Sogndal
 Mathias Bringaker - Start
 Lars-Jørgen Salvesen - Start
 Mathias Sørkilflå - Steinkjer
 Thomas Sivertsen - Steinkjer
 Bassel Jradi - Strømsgodset
 Amahl Pellegrino - Strømsgodset
 Runar Espejord - Tromsø
 Ole Andreas Nesset - Ullensaker/Kisa
 Nicolay Solberg - Ullensaker/Kisa
 Emmanuel Bergstrøm - Ullern
 Fitim Azemi - Vålerenga
 Simen Juklerød - Vålerenga
 Felipe Carvalho - Vålerenga
 Martin Hummervoll - Vidar
 Tommy Høiland - Viking

1 goal:

 Jernade Meade - Aalesunds
 Mats Frede Hansen - Alta
 William Arne Hanssen - Alta
 Felix Adrian Jacobsen - Alta
 Håvard Mannsverk - Alta
 Martin Hole Hanstvedt - Arna-Bjørnar
 Andreas Fantoft - Åsane
 Erik Huseklepp - Åsane
 Erlend Hellevik Larsen - Åsane
 Håkon Lorentzen - Åsane
 Aleksander Solli - Åsane
 Daniel Steensæth Tørum - Åsane
 Cornelius Bencsik - Asker
 Jan Aubert - Bærum
 Jon Tveit Rønning - Bærum
 Franjo Tepurić - Bergsøy
 Craig Stuart Rogers - Bergsøy
 Philip Zinckernagel - Bodø/Glimt
 Thomas Drage - Bodø/Glimt
 Trond Olsen - Bodø/Glimt
 Ulrik Saltnes - Bodø/Glimt
 Ludcinio Marengo- Brann
 Daniel Braaten - Brann
 Aune Selland Heggebø- Brann
 Jonas Grønner- Brann
 Azar Karadas- Brann
 Peter Orry Larsen- Brann
 Scott Drabløs Fellows - Brattvåg
 Torbjørn Grytten - Brattvåg
 Daniel Stensøe - Brattvåg
 Fredrik Haave Andersen - Brumunddal
 Omar Fonstad el Ghaouti - Bryne
 Mads Bøgild - Bryne
 Einar Tunheim Lye - Bryne
 Markus Aaser Grønli - Drøbak-Frogn
 Chris Sleveland - Egersunds
 Kenneth Grande Nyborg - Egersunds
 Kim Robert Nyborg - Egersunds
 Jonatan André Teigland - Eidsvold
 Johan Finnmann Gulliksen - Eik-Tønsberg
 Eivind Holte Tøråsen - Elverum
 Robin Rasch - Elverum
 Elmahdi Bellhcen - Elverum
 Thomas Aloyseous - Finnsnes
 Joar Hoberg - Fjøra
 Morten Knutsen - Fjøra
 Sondre Krogstad Høyem - Flint
 Adrian Krysian - Flint
 Lorent Callaku - Florø
 Fredrik Michalsen - Fløya
 Kevin Beugré - Fram Larvik
 Henrik Bredeli - Fram Larvik
 Mahmoud Laham - Fram Larvik
 Mads Nielsen - Fredrikstad
 Tim André Nilsen - Fredrikstad
 Ludvig Begby - Fredrikstad
 Kaspar Bergset - Fyllingsdalen
 Eirik Kampenes - Fyllingsdalen
 Henrik Nyland - Fyllingsdalen
 Zirak Ahmed - Grorud
 Fredrick Pettersen - Grorud
 Orri Sigurður Ómarsson - HamKam
 Aron Dønnum - HamKam
 Abubakar Aliyu Ibrahim - HamKam
 Simen Bolkan Nordli - HamKam
 Rubén Alegre - HamKam
 Nikica Košutić - Harstad
 Ibrahima Koné - Haugesund
 Christian Grindheim- Haugesund
 Vegard Skjerve- Haugesund
 Aleksandar Kovačević - Haugesund
 Emil Fosse - Herd
 Steffen Moltu - Hødd
 Magnus Myklebust - Hødd
 Markus Naglestad - Hødd
 Joachim Osvold - Hødd
 Bendik Rise - Hødd
 Eirik Saunes - Hødd
 Daniel Østebø - Hønefoss
 Markus Thorberg - Hønefoss
 Luke Ferreira - Jerv
 Christian Follerås - Jerv
 Andreas Hagen - Jerv
 Lasse Johan Berg - Junkeren
 Håkon Aalmen - KFUM Oslo
 Dadi Dodou Gaye - KFUM Oslo
 Fisnik Kastrati - KFUM Oslo
 Stian Sortevik - KFUM Oslo
 Simen Vedvik - KFUM Oslo
 Lowrens Piero Rosinelli Becerra - Kjelsås
 Jesper Solli - Kjelsås
 Jesper Taaje - Kjelsås
 Even Bydal - Kongsvinger
 Martin Lundal - Kongsvinger
 Bendik Bye - Kristiansund
 Sondre Sørli - Kristiansund
 Bent Sørmo - Kristiansund
 Aliou Coly - Kristiansund
 Solomon Duah - Levanger
 Jo Sondre Aas - Levanger
 Heike Lie Konradsen - Levanger
 Robert Stene - Levanger
 Adrià Mateo López - Levanger
 Ermal Hajdari - Levanger
 Mats Haakenstad - Lillestrøm
 Fredrik Krogstad - Lillestrøm
 Aleksander Melgalvis - Lillestrøm
 Erik Sandberg - Lillestrøm
 Andreas Storsveen Romøren - Lørenskog
 Chimaobi Ifejilika - Lyn
 Stian Dyngeland - Lysekloster
 Kristoffer Østervold - Lysekloster
 Adrian Pedersen - Melbu
 Nikita Kalinins - Mjølner
 Fredrik Arntsen - Mjølner
 Mathias Johnsen - Mjølner
 Sebastian Temte Hansen - Mjøndalen
 Ylldren Ibrahimaj - Mjøndalen
 Jonathan Lindseth - Mjøndalen
 Alfred Scriven - Mjøndalen
 Fredrik Brustad - Molde
 Christoffer Engan - Nardo
 Alexander Dang - Nest-Sotra
 Joachim Edvardsen - Nest-Sotra
 Johnny Furdal - Nest-Sotra
 Sondre Liseth - Nest-Sotra
 Andreas Rødsand - Nest-Sotra
 Andreas Hoven - Notodden
 Erlend Hustad - Notodden
 Martin Broberg - Odd
 Joshua Kitolano - Odd
 Bilal Njie - Odd
 Birk Risa - Odd
 Jan Inge Lynum - Orkla
 Artan Brovina - Ørn-Horten
 Øystein Takle Eide - Os
 Markus Cham - Østsiden
 Christoffer Alagie Jatta Skårn - Østsiden
 Jens Aase - Øystese
 Vegard Kongsro - Pors Grenland
 Andreas Helmersen - Ranheim
 Daniel Kvande - Ranheim
 Mads Reginiussen - Ranheim
 Sivert Solli - Ranheim
 Sondre Sørløkk - Ranheim
 Ryan Doghman- Raufoss
 Snorre Strand Nilsen- Raufoss
 Mikal Haugen Bjørnstad - Rosenborg
 Đorđe Denić - Rosenborg
 Mike Jensen - Rosenborg
 Marius Lundemo - Rosenborg
 Magnus Stamnestrø - Rosenborg
 Alexander Søderlund - Rosenborg
 Anders Trondsen - Rosenborg
 Rafik Zekhnini - Rosenborg
 Sander Moen Foss - Sandefjord
 Pontus Engblom - Sandefjord
 Mohamed Ofkir - Sandefjord
 Erik Mjelde - Sandefjord
 Kachi - Sandnes Ulf
 Vegard Aasen - Sandnes Ulf
 Martin Andersen Grøttå - Sandviken
 Rashad Muhammed - Sarpsborg 08
 Mohammed Usman - Sarpsborg 08
 Kristoffer Larsen - Sarpsborg 08
 Joe Lunde - Sarpsborg 08
 Anders Østli - Sarpsborg 08
 Bjørn Inge Utvik - Sarpsborg 08
 Sebastian Jensen - Senja
 Christer Johnsgård - Senja
 Mustafa Hassan - Skeid
 Ayoub Aleesami - Skeid
 Johannes Andres Nunez Godoy - Skeid
 Stian Pettersen - Skeid
 Reidar Waage - Skjervøy
 Eirik Birkelund - Sogndal 
 Joachim Soltvedt - Sogndal 
 Sigurd Hauso Haugen - Sogndal 
 Håvard Meinseth - Sola
 Johannes Bernhard Hinna - Sola
 Deniss Tarasovs - Sortland
 Kristoffer Stava - Sotra
 Ohi Omoijuanfo - Stabæk
 Ola Brynhildsen - Stabæk
 Martin Rønning Ovenstad - Stabæk
 Tobias Christensen - Start
 Damion Lowe - Start
 Espen Berger - Start
 Espen Børufsen - Start
 Aremu Afeez - Start
 Kevin Kabran - Start
 Elliot Käck - Start
 Niklas Sandberg - Start
 Herolind Shala - Start
 Nedzad Šišić - Stjørdals-Blink
 Sander Erik Kartum - Stjørdals-Blink
 Simen Nordskag - Stjørdals-Blink
 Jørgen Selnes Sollihaug - Stjørdals-Blink
 Andreas Krokbø - Strindheim
 Martin André Elverum Engvik - Strindheim
 Sindre Mauritz-Hansen - Strømmen
 Thor Lange - Strømmen
 Petter Mathias Olsen - Strømmen
 Sebastian Pedersen - Strømmen
 Kristoffer Tokstad - Strømsgodset
 Alexander Jonassen - Træff
 Simon Laugsand - Tromsdalen
 Andreas Løvland - Tromsdalen
 Tor Martin Mienna - Tromsdalen
 Anders Jenssen - Tromsdalen
 Oliver Kjærgaard - Tromsø
 Mushaga Bakenga - Tromsø
 Daniel Berntsen - Tromsø
 Sigurd Grønli - Tromsø
 Christian Landu Landu - Tromsø
 Elhadji Mour Samb - Tromsø
 Nichlas Johansen Midtsand - Trygg/Lade
 Stian Skjeldnes Berre - Trygg/Lade
 Andreas Aalbu - Ullensaker/Kisa
 Truls Jørstad - Ullensaker/Kisa
 Eric Kitolano - Ullensaker/Kisa
 Henrik Loholt Kristiansen - Ullensaker/Kisa
 Ciise Aden Abshir - Ullensaker/Kisa
 Torbjørn Rosvoll - Ullern
 Kyle Spence - Valdres
 Simen Høglien - Valdres
 Sam Johnson - Vålerenga
 João Meira - Vålerenga
 Peter Godly Michael - Vålerenga
 Christian Borchgrevink - Vålerenga
 Mats Kvalvågnes - Vard Haugesund
 Steffen Klemetsen Jakobsen - Vardeneset
 Sigve Kleppa Christensen - Vidar
 Martin Håland - Vidar
 Vetle Hellestø - Vidar
 Anel Valjevcic - Vigør
 Kawsu Jabai - Vindbjart
 Anders Torgersen - Vestfossen

Own goals:
 Anders Ludvigsen - Brumunddal (18 April 2018 vs Valdres)
 Tobias Skjelle Paulsen - Lørenskog (3 May 2018 vs Lillestrøm)
 Mads Lyngen - Bærum (9 May 2018 vs Strømsgodset)
 William Kurtovic - Ullensaker/Kisa (9 May 2018 vs Kongsvinger IL)

References

 
Norwegian Football Cup seasons
Cup
Norwegian Football Cup